Trust & Betrayal: The Legacy of Siboot, often abbreviated simply to Siboot, was a game designed and programmed by Chris Crawford for the Macintosh and published by Mindscape in 1987.

Gameplay 
The player, an alien creature named Vetvel, must compete with six other acolytes (each a different alien species) for the Shepherdship. Each of these characters has a distinct personality. Each morning, the acolytes wake up knowing one of each of the three "auras" the others possess. They must trade knowledge with each other in order to try to gain enough knowledge for the "mind combat" that takes place every night, which is basically a fancy Rock, Paper, Scissors game that depends on the aura counts for the players involved. The game is won when a player gets eight auras in all three categories. However, in giving away somebody's aura count, the player betrays that person, which angers them and may make them less likely to trade aura counts with the player. Therefore, a player has to know who to trust and who to betray, hence the title: Trust & Betrayal.

If the player clicks and holds the mouse button on an icon (the game's abstraction of a word), one can see its meaning. The number of icons is small enough, and the pictures intuitive enough, that they can quickly be committed to memory.

The game uses an inverse parser, a method for constructing sentences out of words while only presenting words that make sense for the given context. It also emphasizes facial expressions as form of feedback. Interludes appear through the game present the user with one of several choices which may affect the gameplay. To use an actual example from the game, if game designer Chris Crawford appears and lectures the player, and the player responds "Go to hell, Crawford!", then he or she loses some favor among the other characters, making the game harder to win.

Development 
"Siboot", the name of the first Shepherd, is a reversal of the syllables of "Bootsie", a cat which Crawford had. Bootsie had to be euthanized due to an irreparable injury to his jaw. Crawford suffered much grief while contemplating that he was unable to talk to Bootsie in order to try to comfort him before he had to be put down. One day while pondering this, Crawford had a flash of insight: his next game would be Talk to the Animals, which evolved into the very different Trust & Betrayal.

A preliminary IBM PC port was made but never finished.

Reception 

Siboot was poorly received in the marketplace and did not recoup its investment. It sold 5,000 units on the Macintosh.

The game received a favorable review in Computer Gaming World, citing the well-written AIs and noting "The context sensitive icon-based language is a technical achievement and deserves praise." In a 1992 survey of science fiction games the magazine stated that the game had "Innovative concepts marred by slow and obtuse game play". In 1994, the same publication surveyed strategic space games set in the year 2000 and gave the game two stars out of five.

The game was reviewed in 1989 in Dragon #150 by Mark D. Veljkov in "The Role of Computers" column. It received 4½ out of 5 stars.

Legacy 
In 2013 Crawford publicly released the source code of several of his games, including Trust & Betrayal.

References

External links 
 Blowing my Siboot-Horn, article on the game by Chris Crawford 1987 for the Journal of Computer Game Design Volume #1 Issue 4 October 1987

1987 video games
Chris Crawford (game designer) games
Commercial video games with freely available source code
Classic Mac OS games
Classic Mac OS-only games
Social simulation video games
Video games about extraterrestrial life
Video games developed in the United States
Mindscape games